Daniel McDonald (July 30, 1960 – February 15, 2007) was an American actor who guest-starred in many TV shows such as CSI: Miami, Law & Order, Murder, She Wrote and Sex and the City. He was also involved in Broadway, performing in Mamma Mia!

Personal life 
McDonald was born the youngest of seven children in Scranton, Pennsylvania, and raised in Romulus, New York. He graduated from Ithaca College.

McDonald's older brother, Christopher McDonald, is also an actor who is seen in many films and television shows.

He met Mujah Maraini-Melehi during the rehearsals for Steel Pier. The couple were married in 1999 and had two children.

Career 
He was a life member of the Actors Studio. He also studied at the Royal Academy of Dramatic Art in London, with Paul Curtis of the American Mime Theatre, and with Sanford Meisner on the island of Bequia in the British West Indies where he met long-time friend and photographer Michael Sanville.

McDonald received a 1997 Tony Award nomination for his lead role in Steel Pier, which co-starred Karen Ziemba and Gregory Harrison.

In 2002, Daniel McDonald replaced Alan Campbell as lead in the national tour of Contact.

The Gift: Life Unwrapped, McDonald's last film, was released posthumously in May 2007.

He recorded an album True Love.

Death 

McDonald died on February 15, 2007, at his home in New York, aged 46. The cause was brain cancer, said Jason Brantley, a spokesman for Mr. McDonald's family. His survivors include his wife, Mujah Maraini-Melehi, and two children, Fosco and Ondina. Funeral services were held February 24, 2007, at the Cathedral Church of Saint John the Divine in New York City.

Filmography

Movies

Television

References

External links 
 
 
 Daniel McDonald Bio

1960 births
2007 deaths
Male actors from New York (state)
Male actors from Pennsylvania
American male stage actors
American male television actors
American male musical theatre actors
Deaths from brain cancer in the United States
People from Romulus, New York
Actors from Scranton, Pennsylvania
20th-century American male actors
Theatre World Award winners
20th-century American male singers
20th-century American singers